Regina Maršíková (born 11 December 1958) is a retired tennis player from Czechoslovakia, present-day Czech Republic.

Career
Maršíková won the French Junior Championships in 1975. She had career wins over Martina Navratilova, Billie Jean King, Evonne Goolagong, Hana Mandlíková, Tracy Austin, and Virginia Wade.

Her best performances in Grand Slam singles events included three consecutive semifinals at the French Open from 1977 to 1979. She won the 1977 French Open women's doubles title with Pam Teeguarden.

Maršíková was involved in an automobile accident in September 1981 near Prague, Czechoslovakia that caused a fatality. She lost her drivers license and visa and served several months in detention. She was not allowed to leave the Eastern Bloc until early 1985. Maršíková rejoined the WTA Tour in April that year at the Tournament of Champions in Florida.

She won 11 singles titles and six doubles titles. She reached a career-high singles ranking of world no. 11 in 1981.

Grand Slam finals

Women's doubles (1 title)

WTA Tour finals

Singles: 14 (11 titles, 3 runner-ups)

Doubles: 12 (6 titles, 6 runner-ups)

Grand Slam singles tournament timeline

Note: The Australian Open was held twice in 1977, in January and December.

References

External links

1958 births
Living people
Czech female tennis players
Czechoslovak female tennis players
French Open champions
Grand Slam (tennis) champions in girls' singles
Grand Slam (tennis) champions in women's doubles
Tennis players from Prague
Czech female criminals
French Open junior champions
Sportspeople convicted of crimes